Centre Culturel et Sportif is a multi-use indoor stadium in Saint-Pierre, Saint-Pierre and Miquelon, France.  It is currently used mostly for futsal matches and athletics. The venue hosts all matches of the Saint Pierre and Miquelon Futsal Championship.

References

External links
  Equipements sportifs et culturels à Saint Pierre (97500)

Football venues in France
Football venues in Saint Pierre and Miquelon
Athletics (track and field) venues in Saint Pierre and Miquelon
Saint-Pierre, Saint Pierre and Miquelon